The 2nd Infantry Division, Queen Sirikit's Guard (พล.๒ รอ.) also known as Mechanized Infantry Division is a mechanized infantry division of the Royal Thai Army. It is currently part of the First Army Area. The division was founded by King Chulalongkorn (Rama V) in 1910. In 1988 the division was designated a King's Guard unit by cabinet order, however, as a mark of distinction the division and all its subsidiary units were put under the patronage of Queen Sirikit and has since been known as the Queen's Guard.

The division is composed of three infantry regiments and three attached units, the 2nd Infantry Regiment, Queen's Guard, the 12th Infantry Regiment, Queen's Guard, and the 21st Infantry Regiment, Queen's Guard. The division and its subsidiary units are all based east of Bangkok, headquartered in Prachinburi, with other units in Chonburi and Sa Kaeo.

History
The 2nd Infantry Division was formed in 1910 at the command of King Chulalongkorn, as a part of the newly reorganised Siamese army. After the Siamese revolution of 1932 the new administration temporarily dissolved all formations above battalion level, including the 2nd Infantry Division. During the Franco-Thai War of 1940-1941, the division's former components were incorporated into the Burapha Army (Eastern army), as the 2nd Division on the orders of Field Marshal Plaek Phibunsongkhram. The division remained part of the army during the Burma Campaign and supported the Phayap Army's invasion of the Shan States. After the end of the war the division was once again dissolved in 1946, this time due to budget cuts. Its headquarters was absorbed into the 2nd Infantry Regiment.

In 1974 the 2nd Division was reconstituted as part of the First Army Area. During the Cold War the division defended the Thai border against Vietnamese incursions and the suppression of domestic communist agitations. The division saw action in at least four border raids by Vietnamese or Kampuchea troops, in 1975, 1978-1979, 1983, and 1984-1985.

On 19 August 1988, the 2nd Infantry Division was designated a King's Guard unit by cabinet order (นร.020/14747). However, as a mark of special distinction the 2nd Infantry Division and all its subsidiary units were put under the royal patronage of Queen Sirikit and has since been known as Queen's Guard.

Mission
Protect and preserve the sovereignty of the nation.
Protection of The Royal Family.
Spearheaded the combat in battlefield.

Composition

2nd Infantry Division, Queen Sirikit's Guard Headquarters.
 2nd Infantry Division, Queen Sirikit's Guard 
 2nd Infantry Regiment, Queen Sirikit's Guard - (aka "Burapha Payak")
 1st Infantry Battalion, Queen Sirikit's Guard
 2nd Infantry Battalion, Queen Sirikit's Guard
 3rd Infantry Battalion, Queen Sirikit's Guard
 12th Infantry Regiment, Queen Sirikit's Guard
 1st Infantry Battalion, Queen Sirikit's Guard
 2nd Infantry Battalion, Queen Sirikit's Guard
 3rd Infantry Battalion, Queen Sirikit's Guard
 21st Infantry Regiment, Queen Sirikit's Guard - (aka "Thahan Suea Rachini")
 1st Infantry Battalion, Queen Sirikit's Guard
 2nd Infantry Battalion, Queen Sirikit's Guard
 3rd Infantry Battalion, Queen Sirikit's Guard
 2nd Field Artillery Regiment, Queen Sirikit's Guard
 2nd Field Artillery Battalion, Queen Sirikit's Guard
 12th Field Artillery Battalion, Queen Sirikit's Guard
 21st Field Artillery Battalion, Queen Sirikit's Guard
 102nd Field Artillery Battalion, Queen Sirikit's Guard
 2nd Service Support Regiment, Queen Sirikit's Guard
 Logistic Battalion, Queen Sirikit's Guard
 2nd Cavalry Squadron, Queen Sirikit's Guard
 30th Cavalry Squadron, Queen Sirikit's Guard
 2nd Signal Corp Battalion, Queen Sirikit's Guard
 2nd Combat Engineer Battalion, Queen Sirikit's Guard
 2nd Medical Battalion, Queen Sirikit's Guard
 2nd Anti-tank Company, Queen Sirikit's Guard
 12th Military Police Battalion
 2nd Long Range Reconnaissance Patrols Company
 12th Military Circle
 14th Military Circle
 18th Military Circle
 19th Military Circle

See also
 1st Division (Thailand)
 4th Infantry Division (Thailand)
 5th Infantry Division (Thailand)
 7th Infantry Division (Thailand)
 9th Infantry Division (Thailand)
 15th Infantry Division (Thailand)
 King's Guard (Thailand)
 Royal Thai Army

References

External links
Official website of the 2nd Infantry Division, King's Guard
Thailand Political Base: กองพลทหารราบที่ 2 รักษาพระองค์ (Thai)

King's Guard units of Thailand
Infantry divisions of Thailand
Military units and formations established in 1910
1910 establishments in Siam